The list of shipwrecks in 1891 includes ships sunk, foundered, grounded, or otherwise lost during 1891.

January

2 January

8 January

9 January

11 January

Unknown date

February

3 February

5 February

6 February

7 February

18 February

19 February

20 February

March

1 March

9 March

13 March

15 March

17 March

19 March

20 March

April

2 April

6 April

15 April

19 April

23 April

28 April

May

2 May

3 May

17 May

21 May

June

4 June

16 June

July

18 July

Unknown date

August

27 August

Unknown date

September

5 September

6 September

7 September

13 September

Unknown date

October

1 October

3 October

10 October

13 October

Unknown date

November

9 November

11 November

15 November

22 November

December

4 December

5 December

8 December

10 December

18 December

23 December

29 December

Unknown date

References

1891